The Royal University Militias were eighteenth-century Spanish colonial military units in the Philippines.

History and uniformology
In 1611, the Spanish Dominicans founded in the city of Manila the University of Santo Tomas.  In 1780, in it were created four Militia Companies, without a fixed number of posts, therefore dependent on the total number of pupils studying there.  In 1785, the termination of these university militias would have been decreed and only when needed would they have been rearmed.

This unit wore a green coat lined with white linen, with a red collar and facings.  Vest and breeches were also green with gold buttons.  Shod with black cordovan shoes and white silk stockings.  On their heads they wore a hat made of felt, with three points, with gold braid hemmed at its edge and a red cockade.

These Royal University militia companies were part of the colonial militia organized after the British occupation of Manila—6 October 1762 through 31 May 1764, or one year, seven months, and twenty-five days—to augment the capabilities of the Spanish colonial army in the Philippines.  These Spanish colonial militia units which existed for five years, were first raised in 1762 when two hundred student volunteers were formed into four companies to fight the British.  After the disbandment of the Royal University Militias in 1785, the UST military unit would reemerge 151 years later, in 1936, as an American colonial ROTC unit.

Until 2001 when compulsory military service was abolished in Spain, University Militias (Milicias Universitarias) also known as I.M.E.C. were a method for Spaniards to fulfill military service obligation.  Militiamen who completed military training became reserve officers or reserve non-commissioned officers.  The program is still active, and there exists one for each of Spain's services:  Army, Navy (I.M.E.C.A.R.), and Air Force.

See also 
 Luzon Grenadiers
 University of Santo Tomas Golden Corps of Cadets
 Reserve Officers' Training Corps (Philippines)

References 

 Alía Plana, Jesús María. El Ejército Español en Filipinas: El Periodo Romántico. Madrid: Tabapress, 1993.
 Ministerio de Defensa. Uniformes del Ejército de América y Filipinas. Vol. 3: (Sur de los Estados Unidos, Real Cuerpo de Ingenieros, Médicos y Oficiales Civiles de la Administratión Militar. Filipinas). Madrid: Artegraf, 1991.
 Villaroel, Fidel. A History of the University of Santo Tomas: Four Centuries of Higher Education in the Philippines (1611-2011). Manila: UST Publishing House, 2012.
 The UST Golden Corps

External links 
Filipinas, uniformes del siglo XVIII.  In the top and center illustrations, the third figure from the right is a depiction of a Royal University militiaman.
Tropas de ultramar, españolas del siglo XVIII.  The sixth illustration shows a militiaman of the Battalion of the University of Manila in 1780.
Uniformes militaires des troupes françoises et étrangères l'Infanterie Cavalerie Dragons et Hussards.  French eighteenth-century army uniforms, which Spanish uniforms of that period—such as those of the Royal University Militias—resembled.

Military units and formations of Spain
History of Manila
University of Santo Tomas